The Society of Christian Philosophers (SCP) was founded in 1978. The society is open to anyone interested in philosophy who considers himself or herself a Christian. Membership is not restricted to any particular "school" of philosophy or to any branch of Christianity, nor to professional or academic philosophers. Terence Cuneo of the University of Vermont is currently President of the SCP, Justin McBrayer of Fort Lewis College is Executive Director, and Kevin Timpe of Calvin University is Treasurer.

Meetings of the society are regularly held in conjunction with the American Catholic Philosophical Association, the Eastern, Central, and Pacific Divisions of the American Philosophical Association, and the Canadian Philosophical Association, and at the World Congress of Philosophy. The society also publishes a quarterly journal, Faith and Philosophy, which addresses philosophical issues from a Christian perspective.

Presidents

 1978–1981: William Alston
 1981–1983: Robert Merrihew Adams
 1983–1986: Alvin Plantinga
 1986–1989: Marilyn McCord Adams
 1989–1992: George I. Mavrodes
 1992–1995: Nicholas Wolterstorff
 1995–1998: Eleonore Stump
 1998–2001: C. Stephen Evans
 2001–2004: Robert Audi
 2004–2007: Linda Zagzebski
 2007–2010: William J. Wainright
 2010–2013: Peter van Inwagen
 2013–2016: Michael Rea
 2016–2019: Michael Bergmann
 2020–present: Terence Cuneo

References

External links
 

1978 establishments in the United States
Christian organizations based in the United States
Christian organizations established in 1978
Christian philosophy
Philosophical societies in the United States